Leśniewice may refer to:

Leśniewice, Kuyavian-Pomeranian Voivodeship, Poland
Leśniewice, Masovian Voivodeship, Poland